Synnøve des Bouvrie (born 16 November 1944) is a Norwegian philologist.

She was born in Naarden, Netherlands as a twin. She took her classical languages education at Leiden University. In her academic career she served as managing director of the Norwegian Institute at Athens and professor of antique culture and literature at the University of Tromsø. She is a fellow of the Center for Hellenic Studies, Harvard and the Norwegian Academy of Science and Letters.

References 

1944 births
Living people
Leiden University alumni
Norwegian expatriates in the Netherlands
Norwegian philologists
Classical philologists
Women classical scholars
Norwegian expatriates in Greece
Academic staff of the University of Tromsø
Norwegian women academics
Women philologists
Members of the Norwegian Academy of Science and Letters
Norwegian twins